William Pinnock was a publisher and writer.

William Pinnock may also refer to:
William Henry Pinnock, see William Pinnock
William Pinnock (MP) for Warwick (UK Parliament constituency)